The Tremalzo Pass (el. 1702 m.) is a mountain pass in Trentino in Italy.

It lies near Trento and Lake Garda. The pass road was built for strategic reasons during World War I. The south side of the pass requires an all-terrain vehicle. Chains are required from September to May. The pass road has a maximum grade of 14%.

See also
 List of highest paved roads in Europe
 List of mountain passes

Tremalzo